Coalway is a village in the West Forest of Dean region of Gloucestershire, England, approximately one mile south-east of the town of Coleford. Within the civil parish of Coleford, the village is just south of the village of Broadwell.

History
An ancient route known in 1345 as the coal way ran north-westwards from the Forest boundary at Coalway Lane End and down Lord's hill to join the main road through Coleford east of Coller brook. Known later as Coller Lane, it was used by travellers from the Purton passage on the River Severn in the later 17th century.

Early building at Coalway was on or near the road between Coleford and Parkend, which was diverted southwards after it was turnpiked in 1796. There was a beerhouse at Coalway by 1841, and this had expanded to three public houses by the late 1870s. The last remaining of these is The Crown Inn. The Primitive Methodists built a chapel called "Pisgah" at Coalway in 1861.

A recreation ground was laid out at Coalway in the later 1930s and a village hall was built on it in 1988. A school opened in 1966 when Coalway Infants School opened; this was followed by Coalway Junior school in 1977.

References

External links

Forest of Dean
Villages in Gloucestershire
Coleford, Gloucestershire